Bameng is a village in East Kameng district of Arunachal Pradesh

Bameng is one of the 60 constituencies of Legislative Assembly of Arunachal Pradesh. Name of current MLA (August-2016) of this constituency is Goruk pordung.

References

Villages in East Kameng district